Bon Dalien is a harvest festival ritual and celebration in Cambodia.

Dalien Tholus on Mars in named after this festival.

See also
 Som Toeuk Plieng

References

Festivals in Cambodia